Pia Camil (born 1980) is a Mexican contemporary artist. Camil works in painting, sculpture, installation and performance.

Biography 
Pia Camil was born in 1980 in Mexico City, Mexico. Camil was raised in Mexico City.

Camil focused on studying painting in her college education. She earned a B.F.A. in Painting in 2003 from the Rhode Island School of Design, and an M.F.A. in 2008 from the Slade School of Fine Art, in London. 

Camil’s work is usually associated to the Mexican urban landscape, the aesthetic language of modernism and its relationship to retail and advertising. Recently she has engaged in public participation as a way to activate the work and engage with the politics of consumerism.

Her work is included in many public museum collections including Solomon R. Guggenheim Museum, Centre Pompidou, Blanton Museum of Art, and others.

Exhibitions

Solo exhibitions 
 Pia Camil: Three Works, Museum of Contemporary Art, Tucson, Tucson, Arizona (2021)
Telón de Boca, Museo Universitario del Chopo, Mexico City, Mexico, curated by Itzel Vargas. (2018)
 Fade to Black: Sit, Relax, Look, Savannah College of Art and Design Museum, Savannah, Georgia. (2018)
 Bara, Bara, Bara, Dallas Contemporary, Dallas, Texas. Curated by Justine Ludwig. (2017)
 Divisor Pirata, NuMu (Nuevo Museo de Arte Contemporáneo), Guatemala City, Guatemala. (2016)
 A Pot for A Latch, second edition, Manetti Shrem Museum of Art at the University of California, Davis, California. (2016)
 Slats, Skins & Shopfittings, Blum & Poe, New York City, New York. (2016)
 A Pot for A Latch, New Museum, New York City, New York. (2016)

Group exhibitions 

 Aichi Triennial 2019, Nagoya, Japan. (2019)
2019 Desert X Biennial, Camil's work was co-created with Cinthia Marcelle. (2019)

References

External links 
 

Date of birth missing (living people)
Living people
Mexican women painters
Mexican women sculptors
21st-century Mexican painters
21st-century Mexican sculptors
1980 births
Rhode Island School of Design alumni
Artists from Mexico City
Alumni of the Slade School of Fine Art